Barton Brands, Ltd. was a company that produced a variety of distilled beverages and liqueurs and is now part of the Sazerac Company, which is headquartered in New Orleans, Louisiana, and has its principal offices in Louisville, Kentucky. The Barton distillery, currently known as the Barton 1792 distillery, was originally established in 1879, and is located in Bardstown, Kentucky.

Some of Barton's better-known brands and products have included the 1792 Bourbon, Kentucky Tavern, and Very Old Barton bourbons; Fleischmann's, Skol and Wave Vodkas; the 99 line of schnapps (99 Apples, 99 Bananas, etc.); Calypso and Barton rums; Capitan, El Toro and Montezuma tequilas and Mr. Boston and Fleischmann's gins.

In 1993, Barton was acquired by Canandaigua Wine Company, later Constellation Brands. In 2009, Constellation sold Barton to the Sazerac Company.

List of products

Bourbons 
 1792 Bourbon (formerly called Ridgewood Reserve 1792 and 1792 Ridgemont Reserve)
 Thomas S. Moore Extended Cask Finish
 Very Old Barton 
 Tom Moore
 Kentucky Gentleman
 Kentucky Tavern 
 Colonel Lee
 Zackariah Harris
 Flatboat

Blended American whiskey 
 Barton 
 Fleischmann's 
 Imperial
 Old Thompson 
 Ten High

Canadian whisky 
 Barton's Canadian
 Canadian Host
 Canadian LTD
 Canadian Supreme
 Mr. Boston Five Star Canadian
 Northern Light Canadian

Scotch whisky 
 Highland Mist
 House of Stuart
 Inver House
 Lauder's
 Vittoria Clan

Whisky liqueur 
 Fireball Cinnamon Whisky

Gin 
 Barton
 Crystal Palace
 Czarina
 Fleischmann's
 Glenmore
 Mr. Boston
 Mr. Boston Riva
 Pikeman
 Skol

Mezcal 
 Monte Alban

Rum 
 Barton
 Calypso
 Fleischmann's
 Mr. Boston
 Skol

Schnapps 
 99 Schnapps (various flavor variations – apple, banana, black cherry, etc.)
 Barton Peach
 Mr. Boston

Tequila and triple sec 
 Capitan
 El Toro
 Montezuma
 Barton Tequila & Triple Sec
 Chi-Chi's Tequila & Triple Sec

Vodka 
 Fleischmann's Vodka
 Barton
 Crystal Palace
 Coulson's
 Czarina
 Glenmore
 Mr. Boston
 Skol
 Wave Flavors

The Barton 1792 Distillery 
The distillery currently known as the Barton 1792 distillery was originally established in 1879. As of June 2018, it comprises 51 buildings – most of which are rickhouses for barrel aging.

Rickhouse collapse in 2018 

In June and July 2018 one of the 29 rickhouses at the Barton 1792 Distillery collapsed in two stages. On June 22, 2018, about half of the building collapsed and caused about 9,000 barrels of spirits being aged there to fall with the structure, although about two-thirds of the barrels remained intact.
The building had been constructed in the 1940s, and one of the walls had been in the process of being repaired when the collapse occurred. Sazerac was given a notice of state law violation for the spill and for failure to properly notify the authorities.
About two weeks later, on July 4, 2018, the remainder of the building collapsed. No one was injured in either collapse.

See also
 List of historic whiskey distilleries

References

External links
Bartonbrands.com – official website (now redirected to sazerac.com)
Barton 1792 Distillery – official website
1792 Bourbon – official website

Sazerac Company brands
Distilleries in Kentucky